This is a list that shows references made to the life and work of Dutch artist Vincent van Gogh (1853–1890) in culture.

Literature
 The artist David Cilnius wrote a poem/lyric called The Dutchman depicting, in a "stream of consciousness" way, Van Gogh's vicissitudes and his death,  referencing also to Steven Naifeh and Gregory Smith 's theory of accidental homicide  
 Letters to Theo, a selection of Vincent's letters to his brother Theo in various sized volumes, became available in several languages during the 1950s, and became popular reading.
 The Flemish writer and visual artist Louis Paul Boon based his novel Abel Gholaerts (1944) on the life of Van Gogh, although he moved the action to Flanders.
 The artist's life forms the basis for Irving Stone's 1934 biographical novel Lust for Life.
 "Starry Night," a poem written by Tupac Shakur, is a dedication to Van Gogh and his work.
 Antonin Artaud wrote a study Van Gogh le suicidé de la société (Van Gogh, The Man Suicided by Society) in 1947, after visiting an exhibition of the painter's works. 
 Paul Celan mentions Van Gogh's ear in his poem Mächte, Gewalten (Powers, Dominions). 
 Woody Allen wrote a parody of Vincent's letters to his brother Theo. The short story "If the Impressionists Had Been Dentists" is included in Allen's 1975 book Without Feathers.
 Paul Gauguin writes about van Gogh in his book Avant et après (Before and After) (903 AD). 
Theun de Vries wrote a novel Vincent in Den Haag (Vincent in The Hague) which takes place between 1881 and 1883.
Ivan Diviš wrote a poem "Goghova milá" ("Gogh's Lover"), published in his book Rozpleť si vlasy (Unplait Your Hair, 1961).
Charles Bukowski wrote a poem on Van Gogh called 'Working Out'.
 The Dutch-Northern Irish writer Remco van Straten published "Hastur's Canvas", framing Vincent van Gogh's time in France in the context of Lovecraftian horror.

Music

Classical
Nevit Kodallı: Van Gogh, Turkish opera (1956)
Gloria Coates: Homage to Van Gogh (1993/94)
Grigori Frid: Letters of van Gogh, mono-opera in two parts for baritone - clarinet, percussion, piano, strings op. 69 (1975) – small Version for baritone - clarinet, piano and violoncello 
Bertold Hummel: Eight fragments from letters of Vincent van Gogh for baritone and string quartet op. 84 (1985) 
Einojuhani Rautavaara: Vincent, opera in three acts (1986-1987). This was based on several events in Van Gogh's life; he later used some of the same themes in his 6th symphony, Vincentiana.
Einojuhani Rautavaara: Vincentiana, symphony N° 6 (1992) - movements: I Tähtiyö (Starry night) II Varikset (The crows) III Saint-Rémy IV Apotheosis 
Henri Dutilleux: Correspondances for soprano and orchestra (2002-2004) - movements: I. Danse cosmique (P. Mukherjee) II. A Slava et Galina... (A. Solschenizyn) III. Gong (R. M. Rilke) IV. Gong II (R. M. Rilke) V. De Vincent à Théo... (V. van Gogh)
Henri Dutilleux, Timbres, espace, mouvement (Timbre, space, movement) is a work for orchestra composed, 1978.

Popular

In 1971, singer Don McLean wrote the ballad "Vincent" in honor of Van Gogh; also known by its opening words, "Starry Starry Night," the song refers to the painting
McLean's song was also sung by Josh Groban in 2002, and the punk band NOFX did a version which can be found on a rarities and b-sides double album. 
In 2006, Hong Kong singer-songwriter Ivana Wong composed a song called "Painting's Meaning" (Traditional Chinese: 畫意) in memory of van Gogh.
In 2007, Folk rock songwriter Freddy Blohm had a different take on Van Gogh in the song "Cheerful."
Bob Neuwirth, a folksinger friend of Bob Dylan's, duetted with Dylan on a whimsical song called "Where did Vincent van Gogh?"during the 1976 Rolling Thunder Revue tour. The song was  written by artist Robert Friemark.
Bandits of the Acoustic Revolution (and later frontman Tomas Kalnoky's other band Streetlight Manifesto) mention van Gogh in their song "Heres to Life": "Vincent Van Gogh why do you weep?/ You were on your way to heaven but the road was steep./ Who was there to break your fall,/ we're guilty one and all."
The title track for Joni Mitchell's album Turbulent Indigo references Van Gogh's madness.  The album cover is a take on Van Gogh's Self-Portrait with Bandaged Ear.
 A Spanish Group is named La Oreja de Van Gogh (Van Gogh's Ear).
The Vigilantes of Love released a song titled "Skin" which is about Van Gogh.
Smooth jazz composer/singer Michael Franks released the song "Vincent's Ear" in 1990 on his Blue Pacific album produced on the Reprise label. Lyrics include "No-one understands all the love inside he tried to give/No-one understands his life was hard to live.
Manic Street Preachers "La Tristesse Durera". The song's title is taken from the reported last words of Vincent van Gogh, "La tristesse durera toujours", quoted in a letter from his younger brother Theo to their sister Elisabeth, using her nickname Lies.[3] The letter was translated by Robert Harrison, who states that the phrase means "The sadness will last forever".[3]
Brian Eno and John Cale recorded "Spinning Away" on their album Wrong Way Up (1990). An example lyric states "One by one, all the stars appear/As the great winds of the planet spiral in/Spinning away, like the night sky at Arles"
Matthew Perryman Jones' album "Land of the Living" includes the song "O Theo", in which the lyrics imagine that Vincent is writing about his life to his brother Theo, echoing how the real Vincent wrote vividly to Theo in his many letters.

Film and television

 Lust for Life, a 1934 novel by Irving Stone, was adapted into a film of the same name. It was directed by Vincente Minnelli and George Cukor and produced by John Houseman. The 1956 film starred Kirk Douglas as Vincent van Gogh and Anthony Quinn as Paul Gauguin. The film was nominated for four Academy Awards, including best actor and best supporting actor, for which Anthony Quinn won.
 In 1948, Alain Resnais made the documentary Van Gogh. Resnais’ black-and-white film featured only Van Gogh's canvases. According to art and film historian John Walker, "the artist’s personal crisis was inscribed in the images on screen by means of accelerated montage".
 Mai Zetterling and David Hughes made the 1972 documentary-drama Vincent the Dutchman, with Michael Gough in the title role, following in Van Gogh's footsteps and re-visiting the actual locations where he lived and died.
 Australian director Paul Cox made a film called Vincent (also known as Vincent: The Life and Death of Vincent Van Gogh) in 1987, consisting entirely of readings of passages from Vincent's letters (read by John Hurt), and accompanied by scenes of the actual locations where he painted. The entire film is claimed to be seen through Van Gogh's own eyes, including his final suicide.
 Director Alexander Barnett The Eyes of Van Gogh, a film about the 12 months Van Gogh spent in an asylum at St. Remy. web site blog
 Abraham Ségal produced a 70-minute color documentary Van Gogh ou la Revanche Ambiguë (Van Gogh or the Double-edged Triumph) in 1989. This documentary examines the "cult" and "myth" of Van Gogh. It is described as an "intelligent account" of the phenomenon, including scenes of the New York auction of Van Gogh's Irises, of 100-year celebrations in Arles, St. Rémy, Auvers and Amsterdam, as well as interviews with people in Arles, a medical expert, Kirk Douglas, Johan Van Gogh, writers and artists "obsessed" with the artist.
 Japanese filmmaker Akira Kurosawa paid homage to Van Gogh in the 1990 film Dreams. The film was based upon Kurosawa's own dreams and included a vignette titled "Crows" based on the painting Wheat Field with Crows, which starred the American director Martin Scorsese as Van Gogh.
 Michael Rubbo directed the 1990 family film Vincent and Me.
 Director Robert Altman portrayed the life story of Vincent van Gogh (Tim Roth) and of his brother Theo van Gogh (Paul Rhys) in the film Vincent & Theo (1990).
 Maurice Pialat's Van Gogh (1991) starred Jacques Dutronc in the title role. The film earned a record twelve César nominations and Dutronc won the award for best actor.
 Van Gogh appeared as a guest star on the MTV animated series Clone High. His clone is very neurotic and paranoid.
 Simon Schama's Power of Art, a documentary in 2006, starred Andy Serkis as Van Gogh in episode 6.
 In 2009, the IMAX film Van Gogh, een kleurrijk portret (Van Gogh, a colorful portrait) was released.
 In 2009 the film Vincent van Gogh, een zaaier in Etten (Vincent van Gogh, a sower in Etten) came into circulation, the director was Vincent Oudendijk.
 The Yellow House. Van Gogh and Gauguin in Arles.
 In 2010, Benedict Cumberbatch portrayed Van Gogh in the Andrew Hutton bio-documentary Van Gogh: Painted with Words, with Jamie Parker as his brother Theo, showing the correspondence between the two brothers and the circumstances at the moments the letters were written. It is based on the real letters of Vincent and Theo, and updated by Andrew Hutton and Alan Yentob.
 A 2010 episode of Doctor Who titled "Vincent and the Doctor" featured Tony Curran as the artist. He reprised his role at the beginning of "The Pandorica Opens".
 There was a parody of Van Gogh and his ear in the Family Guy episode "Fast Times at Buddy Cianci Jr. High" (2005).
 In 2013, Dutch actor Barry Atsma starred as Vincent in a Dutch miniseries named Van Gogh: een huis voor Vincent (literally: Van Gogh: a house for Vincent; international name The Van Gogh Legacy). The dramatized story of Vincent is told through the eyes of his only surviving nephew Vincent Willem (nl), played by Jeroen Krabbé. The series has been sold to broadcasting corporations in Germany, Italy and South Korea.
 Loving Vincent, the world's first fully hand-painted feature film, was released in 2017.  This animated biopic recounts the life and final days of Van Gogh, with each frame of the film consisting of an oil painting executed in Van Gogh's style and a plot based on letters he wrote.  It was awarded a European Film Award for Best Animated Feature and also earned an Oscar nomination in 2018.
At Eternity's Gate is a 2018 internationally co-produced drama film about the final days of painter. It is directed by Julian Schnabel and stars Willem Dafoe as Van Gogh.  It was selected to be screened in the main competition section of the 75th Venice International Film Festival and was released in November 2018, by CBS Films. Dafoe received an Academy Award nomination for Best Actor for his role.

Theatre
 In the mid 1970s Leonard Nimoy starred in a one-man play called Vincent that he'd adapted from the play Van Gogh by Phillip Stephens. A performance was televised in 1981, and a DVD based on the videorecording was released in 2006. The adapted version was published in 1984.

Video games
 In Luigi's Mansion, there is a ghost named Vincent Van Gore. He is nicknamed the "Starving Artist" in-game, and battles the player by having his paintings of ghosts come to life and attack Luigi. He speaks with a French accent, despite van Gogh speaking mostly Dutch.
 The character of Vince, the art tutor in the Nintendo DS game Art Academy, is based on Vincent van Gogh.
 In June 2015, Rusty Lake created the third installment of Cube Escape, Cube Escape: Arles. This installment ended in Van Gogh walking out into the painting Starry Night.

Popular recognition
 In 2004 he was nominated for the title De Grootste Nederlander (The Greatest Dutchman) and came in 10th place.

References

External links
 Excerpt from Artaud about van Gogh
 El cine pinta a Van Gogh. Van Gogh in the movies.